Ross Anderson may refer to:

Ross Anderson (skier) (born 1971), American alpine and speed skier
Ross Anderson (swimmer) (born 1968), New Zealand swimmer
Ross J. Anderson (born 1956), British researcher, writer, and industry consultant in security engineering
G. Ross Anderson, American attorney, politician, and jurist
Rocky Anderson (Ross Carl Anderson, born 1951), former mayor of Salt Lake City (2000–2008)